The 2002 Campeonato Paulista de Futebol Profissional da Primeira Divisão - Série A1 was the 101st season of São Paulo's top professional football league. The championship proper only had the presence of the smaller teams of the state, since the Rio-São Paulo tournament took up most of the first semester for the bigger teams. The champions would get a berth in the Superchampionship, which would also feature the three best Paulista teams in the Rio-São Paulo. Ituano won the championship by the 1st time, and subsequently, lost the finals of the Superchampionship to São Paulo. Matonense was relegated.

Championship

Relegation Playoffs

Superchampionship

Semifinals

Finals

References

Campeonato Paulista seasons
Paulista